Eric Cyril Boyd Edwards, Baron Chelmer , previously styled Sir Eric Edwards, (9 October 1914 – 3 March 1997) was an English solicitor and organiser for the Conservative Party. He was Chairman of the National Executive Committee of the National Union of Conservative and Unionist Associations from 1957 to 1965, and Joint Treasurer of the party from 1965 to 1977.

Early life
Eric Edwards was the eldest son of Colonel C E Edwards DSO, a solicitor and Liberal councillor. He attended Felsted School, and gave up his early hope of becoming a diplomat to enter his father's firm of solicitors, after taking an LLB at the University of London. He joined the Essex Yeomanry, which in World War II became 147th (Essex Yeomanry) Regiment, Royal Horse Artillery. He fought in the invasion of France, winning a Military Cross in 1944, and gaining the rank of lieutenant-colonel. He was commanding officer of the Essex Yeomanry in 1945–6.

Conservative Party
After the war, he and his father joined the Conservative Party. Having failed to be preselected as Parliamentary candidate for Southend, he thereafter served the party in a voluntary capacity, at the same time adding insurance and property interests to his legal career. With the support of Harold Macmillan, he rose to become deputy party chairman. He was knighted in the 1954 Birthday Honours. and had the honour conferred on him by the Queen on 6 July.

With Oliver Poole, he transformed party funding by setting a quota for subscription revenue from each constituency branch, with the results published at the annual party conference.

House of Lords
On 31 January 1963 he was created Baron Chelmer, of Margaretting in the County of Essex, but never gave a maiden speech in the House of Lords, in keeping with the custom for party fund-raisers. He made 13 speeches in all. When Macmillan retired that year, he got The Lord Chelmer to sound out The Earl of Home as his successor, with the party split between Quintin Hogg and Rab Butler.

Arms

Personal life
He married Enid Harvey in 1939; they had one son.

Other interests
He was on the board of directors of several companies. He enjoyed sailing, especially catamarans, and was involved with music charities.

References

1914 births
1997 deaths
Conservative Party (UK) life peers
English solicitors
Knights Bachelor
Recipients of the Military Cross
Royal Artillery officers
British Army personnel of World War II
People from Essex
People educated at Alleyn Court School
People educated at Felsted School
Alumni of the University of London
20th-century British lawyers
Essex Yeomanry officers
20th-century English lawyers
Life peers created by Elizabeth II
Military personnel from Essex